The Romantic Englishwoman is a 1975 British film directed by Joseph Losey and starring Michael Caine, Glenda Jackson, Helmut Berger. It marks the feature-length screen debut for Kate Nelligan. The screenplay was written by Tom Stoppard and Thomas Wiseman.

Caine plays a successful English novelist whose discontented wife, played by Jackson, decides to take a holiday to Germany in order to "find herself". There she meets a mysterious young man, played by Berger, in an elevator, which initiates an often bizarre, but extremely mature examination of desire, responsibility and the nature of love.

The film was shown at the 1975 Cannes Film Festival, but not entered into the main competition.

Plot
Elizabeth, bored wife of Lewis, a successful pulp writer in England, leaves husband and child and runs away to the German town of Baden-Baden. There she meets Thomas, who claims to be a poet but whom viewers know to be a petty thief, conman, drug courier, and gigolo. Though the two are briefly attracted to each other, she returns home. He, hunted by gangsters for a drug consignment he has lost, follows her to England. Lewis, highly suspicious of his wife, invites the young man to stay with them and act as his secretary. Initially resenting the presence of the handsome stranger, Elizabeth one night starts an affair and, after being caught together in the conservatory by Lewis, the two run away with no money to the south of France. Lewis follows them, he in turn being followed by the gangsters looking for Thomas. At the end the gangsters reclaim Thomas, presumably for execution, while Lewis reclaims Elizabeth.

Cast
 Glenda Jackson as Elizabeth Fielding
 Michael Caine as Lewis Fielding
 Helmut Berger as Thomas
 Michael Lonsdale as Swan, chief gangster
 Béatrice Romand as Catherine, nanny
 Kate Nelligan as Isabel, friend of the Fieldings
 Nathalie Delon as Miranda
 Reinhard Kolldehoff as Herman
 Anna Steele as Annie
 Marcus Richardson as David
 Julie Peasgood as New Nanny
 Frankie Jordan as Supermarket Cashier
 Tom Chatto as Neighbour
 Frances Tomelty as Airport Shop Assistant

References

External links 
 
 

1975 films
1975 drama films
Adultery in films
1970s English-language films
Films about writers
Films directed by Joseph Losey
Films set in England
Films set in France
Films set in West Germany
British drama films
1970s British films